Patrick Wellington Brown (born May 29, 1992) is an American professional ice hockey forward for the  Ottawa Senators of the National Hockey League (NHL).

Early life
Brown was born on May 29, 1992, in Bloomfield Hills, Michigan, to Doug Brown, a former National Hockey League right winger, and Maureen Brown (nee Mara), daughter of Wellington and Ann Mara and a member of the family that owns 50% of the New York Giants. His father played in the NHL for 15 seasons and won back-to-back Stanley Cup championships with the Detroit Red Wings in 1997 and 1998, while his uncle Greg played professional ice hockey in North America and Europe for 11 years before retiring to help coach the Boston College Eagles men's ice hockey team.

Brown followed his father into ice hockey, and in 2005, he played in the Quebec International Pee-Wee Hockey Tournament with a minor ice hockey team from Detroit.

Playing career

NCAA
Brown played for the Boston College Eagles men's ice hockey team of the NCAA Hockey East Conference, from 2010 to 2014, and was captain during his senior season. He was a member of the Eagles roster that won the 2012 National Championship.

Professional

Carolina Hurricanes
On April 12, 2014, Brown was signed as an undrafted free agent to a two-year entry-level contract with the Carolina Hurricanes. Brown was recalled to make the Hurricanes opening night roster in his first professional season in 2014–15. He made his NHL debut with the Hurricanes in a defeat to the New York Islanders on October 10, 2014. He recorded his first career NHL goal and assist on March 31, 2016, against the New York Rangers. He spent the majority of his tenure in the Hurricanes' organization with their American Hockey League (AHL) affiliate, the Charlotte Checkers, where he was team captain from 2016 to 2019 and won a Calder Cup in 2019.

Vegas Golden Knights
After spending the first five seasons of his professional career within the Hurricanes organization, Brown left as a free agent to sign a two-year, $700,000 contract with the Vegas Golden Knights on July 1, 2019. He spent most of the season with  Golden Knights' AHL affiliate, the Chicago Wolves. In 2021, he was named the team captain of the Golden Knights' new AHL affiliate, the Henderson Silver Knights.

Philadelphia Flyers
Brown was placed on waivers by the Golden Knights on October 10, 2021 and claimed by the Philadelphia Flyers the next day.

Ottawa Senators
On March 3, 2023, the Flyers traded Brown to the Ottawa Senators in exchange for a sixth-round pick in the 2023 NHL Entry Draft.

Personal life
Brown's younger brother Christopher also played at Boston College, and was captain during his junior and senior seasons. While Christopher was drafted by the Buffalo Sabres, he has not appeared in the NHL; he currently dresses for the Jacksonville Icemen in the ECHL.

Brown's maternal grandfather is Wellington Mara, longtime owner and president of the NFL's New York Giants. He is also cousins with actresses Kate and Rooney Mara.

Career statistics

Awards and honors

References

External links

1992 births
American men's ice hockey centers
Boston College Eagles men's ice hockey players
Carolina Hurricanes players
Charlotte Checkers (2010–) players
Chicago Wolves players
Cranbrook Educational Community alumni
Henderson Silver Knights players
Ice hockey players from Michigan
Living people
Mara family
Ottawa Senators players
People from Bloomfield Hills, Michigan
Philadelphia Flyers players
Undrafted National Hockey League players
Vegas Golden Knights players